The Brodsky Synagogue in Odesa was built by the Jews from Brody in 1863 in Odesa, Ukraine. It was the largest synagogue in the south of the then Russian Empire. People came from all over the world to hear cantors sing there.

History

Early 1800s
In the early 1800s, Jewish immigrants began to stream into Odesa from Europe, many of them coming from the town of Brody in western Ukraine.

In the 1840s, the Brody Jews leased their first synagogue, at the corner of Pushkin and Postal (now Zhukovsky) streets in a relatively small house from the wealthy Greek businessman Ksenysu. The Cantor was Rabbi Nissan Blumenthal, who had also come from the town of Brody.

The reformation of synagogues was also one of the priorities of Maskilim in the city, the Brodsky Synagogue, soon become a model for Jewish prayer in the region. The older Glavaina synagogue, formerly known as Beit Knesset Ha Gadol established in 1795 and located in main arteries of the city, was transformed on the lines of Brody Synagogue. 

One of the documents from the Office of Novorossiysk and Bessarabian Governor-General, dated 1852, states: "All the educated people of the Jewish community in Odesa are going there. Their school leases a house, but it is deliberately arranged. The hall is quite extensive, there is also a gallery for the women…”

The new synagogue
In 1860, they received permission to begin building a new synagogue. It was designed by the famous architect Joseph N. Kollovich in the Gothic Florentine style, built with local limestone, and completed in 1863. It was the largest synagogue in the south of the then Russian empire.

Many famous composers and singers performed in the synagogue. Among them the composer Novakovsky, and Cantor Pinhas Minkowsky.

The synagogue is mentioned in writings of Isaac Babel, Sholem Aleichem, and Ivan Bunin (the first Russian writer to win the Nobel Prize for Literature). Ze'ev Jabotinsky, and Meir Dizengoff, former Mayor of Tel Aviv, are among the many Jews associated with this synagogue.

Odesa at one point boasted the second-largest Jewish population (after Warsaw), according to YIVO. In 1897, Jews made up 34.6% of the city's population.

Synagogue in the Soviet era
In 1920, all the synagogues in Odesa were taken away from the Jewish community. The Brodsky Synagogue was transformed into the “Rosa Luxemburg Workers Club”, as recorded in YIVO archives, which was a meeting place to push socialist propaganda. The Ten Commandments over the synagogue's ark were covered with a photo of Vladimir Lenin.

During WWII
In 1939, the Jewish population had numbered 80,000 to 90,000, but by 1945 only 5,000 remained.

During the war, Adolf Hitler requested Romanian leader Ion Antonescu to occupy the Ukrainian territory between Dniester and Bug Rivers. In those days, the Odesa Oblast State Archive was located in the basement of the Uspensky cathedral. The Romanians moved the archive into the Brodsky Synagogue.

Today

Local and national landmark
In August 1985, the Odesa Oblast Council established the Brodsky Synagogue as a monument of local importance. In June 2006, the Ministry of Culture and Tourism of Ukraine included the building in the State Register of Monuments of Ukraine.

Today, the building is on the verge of collapse. It has not been renovated for many years. The walls are being held by the bookshelves inside.

Restoration
As of February 2016, the Brodsky Synagogue has been returned to the Jewish Community of Odesa. The decision was reached by a decisive majority of the regional council who voted to transfer the building taken from its community nearly 100 years ago.

The building, once restored, will house the Chabad Lubavitch Congregation and the Odesa Jewish Museum and Tolerance Center.

References

External links
http://timer-odessa.net/statji/Ta_Odessa__Brodskaya_sinagoga_v_ocheredi_na_unic.html
http://www.odessaguide.net/sights_brodskasynagogue.ru.html
http://www.holst.od.ua/odessa/photos.php?p_id=161

Religious buildings and structures in Odesa
Proposed museums
Orthodox synagogues in Ukraine
Synagogues completed in 1863
Gothic Revival synagogues
Jews and Judaism in Odesa
Gothic Revival architecture in Ukraine